Wincanton railway station was a station in the county of Somerset, in England. It was located on the Somerset and Dorset Joint Railway.

Sited on a double line stretch of the S&D, the station had two platforms with a station building. A goods yard, controlled from a signal box on platform one, gave access to sidings for the use of the horses from the local racecourse. The Cow & Gate creamery and dairy products factory had its own sidings, providing access for milk trains.

History
The station was opened on 3 February 1862 by the Dorset Central Railway which later became part of the Somerset and Dorset Joint Railway. Goods Yard closed 5 April 1965. The station was closed when the S&DJR closed on 7 March 1966.

Further reading

References

External links
 Wincanton station on SDJR website
 Wincanton station on navigable 1946 O. S. map

Disused railway stations in Somerset
Former Somerset and Dorset Joint Railway stations
Railway stations in Great Britain opened in 1862
Railway stations in Great Britain closed in 1966
Beeching closures in England
Wincanton
1862 establishments in England